John Rider Lamason (29 October 1905 – 25 June 1961) was a cricketer who played for Wellington from 1927–28 to 1946–47, and for New Zealand, but not in Test matches.

A hard-hitting middle order batsman and an occasional right-arm off break bowler, Lamason played for seven years for Wellington in the Plunket Shield competition before his first century, 103 against Otago in 1934–35. He captained the side from 1935 to 1936 (when Wellington won the Plunket Shield) to 1937–38.

In the 1934–35 and 1935–36 seasons, he was close to the top of the domestic batting averages, and he was picked for the 1937 New Zealand tour of England. He was not a success: he made only 395 runs on the tour at an average of 15.80 with a top score of 71, and was not chosen for any of the Test matches. He played occasional first-class cricket for almost 10 years after the tour, but his top score in that period was just 31.

His highest first-class score was 127 for Wellington against Auckland in 1935-36 and his best bowling figures were 5 for 67 (followed by 4 for 109 in the second innings) against Auckland in 1934–35.

He also captained Wellington at Rugby football.

His wife was Ina Lamason, who played cricket and hockey for Wellington and New Zealand. They married in Wellington in December 1938. His sister, Joy Lamason, also played for Wellington and New Zealand.

References

 Wisden Cricketers' Almanack, 1938 edition

1905 births
1961 deaths
Wellington cricketers
New Zealand cricketers
North Island Army cricketers
North Island cricketers